Phelloe was a fortified town and polis (city-state) of ancient Achaea, 40 stadia from Aegeira, through the mountains. According to the geographer Pausanias, it abounded in springs of water.

Its site is tentatively located near the modern Zacholi/Seliana.

References

Populated places in ancient Achaea
Former populated places in Greece
Achaean city-states